Lagos Television (abbreviated LTV), or Lagos Weekend Television (abbreviated LWT, UHF channel 35, also known as LTV 8) It is a state owned television station in Ikeja, Lagos, Nigeria.  Lagos State Television was established  In October, 1980 under the administration of Alhaji Lateef Jakande to disseminate information and entertain the populace. It became the first television station to be founded by a state government. It began broadcasting on November 9 of that year and was the first Television station in Nigeria to operate on two frequencies / bands VHF and UHF. Now on UHF channel 35, it was the first state owned Television station on cable satellite DSTV channel 256 and later on Startimes channel 104.

The objective of Lagos Television was to allow the state administration to disseminate information  and entertain the general public and the link between the government and the populace.

Under military rule, Lagos television was moved to UHF channel 35.

In September 1985, a mysterious fire destroyed the entire station, it studio, library as well as official records was damaged.

References

External links
 Official website

Mass media in Lagos
Television channels and stations established in 1980
Companies based in Lagos
Television stations in Lagos